Elizabeth Warren Dunn is a Canadian social psychologist and a Professor of Social Psychology at the University of British Columbia (UBC). In 2015, Dunn was elected a member of the College of New Scholars, Artists and Scientists within the Royal Society of Canada.

Education
Dunn conducted her undergraduate studies at Harvard University. While there, she worked under Daniel Gilbert which inspired her to study understanding human happiness. As a graduate student, she was inspired to study how couples happiness changed with each other and with strangers.

Career

After conducting her postdoctoral research, she joined the faculty at the University of British Columbia (UBC) in 2005.  

In 2008, she co-authored and published a study in Science which found that humans find giving to others rewarding and it increases their happiness levels. Dunn and her team surveyed 109 UBC students who said they hypothetically would spending money on themselves than otherwise. However, once actually given the money, her team discovered they were happier spending it on others. Two years later, Dunn received a New Investigator Award from the Canadian Institutes of Health Research and UBC’s Robert E. Knox Master Teacher Award.

In 2012, she published "Giving Leads to Happiness in Young Children" with J. Kiley Hamlin and Lara Aknin, which supported the idea that humans may have evolved to find giving rewarding. The next year, Dunn co-authored and published "Happy Money: The New Science of Smarter Spending" with Michael Norton.

In 2015, Dunn was elected a member of the College of New Scholars, Artists and Scientists within the Royal Society of Canada. She was also named a Social Sciences and Humanities Research Council of Canada (SSHRC) Impact Award Finalist.

In 2019, she gave a TED talk. TED curator Chris Anderson listed it as one of his favourites of 2019.

References

External links 
 

1978 births
Living people
Place of birth missing (living people)
Social psychologists
Canadian women psychologists
Canadian psychologists
Canadian women academics
Academic staff of the University of British Columbia
University of Virginia alumni
Harvard University alumni
21st-century psychologists